Jari Europaeus (born 29 December 1962 in Helsinki, Finland) is a retired football defender.

During his club career, Europaeus played for HJK Helsinki, Gefle IF, Östers IF, RoPS and Atlantis FC. He made 56 appearances for the Finland national team.

External links
 

1962 births
Living people
Finnish footballers
Finnish expatriate footballers
Finland international footballers
Association football defenders
Helsingin Jalkapalloklubi players
Gefle IF players
Östers IF players
Rovaniemen Palloseura players
Atlantis FC players
Mestaruussarja players
Veikkausliiga players
Allsvenskan players
Expatriate footballers in Sweden
Footballers from Helsinki
20th-century Finnish people